Katrina Ligett is an American computer scientist. She is Associate Professor of computer science and economics at the Hebrew University and Visiting Associate at California Institute of Technology. She is known for work on algorithmic game theory and privacy.

Education
Ligett studied at Brown University, where she completed her BS degree in Mathematics and Computer Science in 2004.  She then earned her MS and PhD in Computer Science from Carnegie Mellon University in 2007 and 2009, respectively.  Her PhD was supervised by Avrim Blum. She has been on the faculty of the California Institute of Technology since 2011. Currently she is Associate Professor of Computer Science and Member of Federmann Center for the Study of Rationality at Hebrew University, as well as Visiting Associate in Computing and Mathematical Sciences at Caltech.

Research

Ligett's work has made notable contributions to two fields: privacy and algorithmic game theory. For example, in the field of data privacy, her work provided a foundation for the field by proving the possibility of answering exponentially many queries about a database while maintaining privacy for individuals. In the field of algorithmic game theory, her work showed that efficiency guarantees proven for Nash equilibrium (so called Price of Anarchy bounds) can be extended to weaker equilibria concepts.

Awards and honors

Ligett received a Microsoft Faculty Research Fellowship in 2013.  In the same year, she received an NSF CAREER award and a Google Faculty Research Award

References

External links
 Katrina Ligett professional home page

Living people
American computer scientists
American women computer scientists
Brown University alumni
Carnegie Mellon University alumni
California Institute of Technology faculty
Theoretical computer scientists
Game theorists
Year of birth missing (living people)